Church of St Peter is a  Grade I listed church in Pavenham, Bedfordshire, England. It became a listed building on 13 July 1964.

The church has some good examples of 14th-century canopied work. The carved panelling and rich woodwork is mainly of Jacobean date; it was installed in the 19th century by Thomas Abbot Green of Pavenham Bury.

See also
Grade I listed buildings in Bedfordshire

References

Church of England church buildings in Bedfordshire
Grade I listed churches in Bedfordshire
Peter